Thomas V. Guynes (born September 9, 1974 in Marion, Indiana) is a former American football offensive lineman.  He played college football as an offensive guard and tackle for the University of Michigan from 1994 to 1996.  He also played professional football for the Arizona Cardinals during the 1997 NFL season.

Early years
Guynes was born in Marion, Indiana, and attended Bishop McNamara High School in Kankakee, Illinois.

University of Michigan
Guynes played college football as an offensive lineman for the University of Michigan from 1994 to 1996.  As a sophomore in 1994, he started 7 games at right tackle, 3 games at right guard and 1 game at left guard.   He started all 12 games at left tackle for the 1996 Michigan Wolverines football team.

Professional football
Guynes played professional football for the Arizona Cardinals in the 1997 NFL season.  He appeared in four games for the Cardinals.  He also played in the NFL Europe for the Berlin Thunder in 2000 and 2001.

Later years
After retiring from football, Guynes worked in law enforcement as a deputy with the Washtenaw County Sheriff Department.

References

1974 births
Michigan Wolverines football players
Arizona Cardinals players
Berlin Thunder players
Living people
People from Marion, Indiana
Players of American football from Indiana